Christian Vander (born 24 October 1980) is a German former professional footballer who played as a goalkeeper. He was the second-choice goalkeeper at SV Werder Bremen behind Tim Wiese after the departure of veteran Andreas Reinke. Before joining Bremen in August 2005, he played for VfL Bochum and KFC Uerdingen 05. He made his league debut for Uerdingen at the age of 19, playing 90 minutes in a 2. Bundesliga match against SpVgg Unterhaching on 9 May 1999.

In 2014, Vander became goalkeeping coach at Werder Bremen.

Honours
Werder Bremen
DFL-Ligapokal: 2006
DFB-Pokal: 2008–09

References

1980 births
Living people
People from Viersen (district)
Sportspeople from Düsseldorf (region)
German footballers
Footballers from North Rhine-Westphalia
Association football goalkeepers
Germany youth international footballers
Bundesliga players
2. Bundesliga players
3. Liga players
KFC Uerdingen 05 players
VfL Bochum players
VfL Bochum II players
Borussia Mönchengladbach players
SV Werder Bremen II players
SV Werder Bremen players
SV Werder Bremen non-playing staff